Founded in 1836 and incorporated in 1871, Shreveport is the third largest city in Louisiana. The city is the parish seat of Caddo Parish. A portion of east Shreveport extends in to Bossier Parish because of the changing course of the Red River.

The city of Shreveport has a mayor-council government. The City's elected officials are: the mayor, and members of the city council.

Under the mayor-council government, the mayor serves as the executive officer of the city. As the city's chief administrator and official representative, the mayor is responsible for the general management of the city and for seeing that all laws and ordinances are enforced.

Current mayor: Adrian Perkins (D)

District A: Willie Bradford (D)
District B: LeVette Fuller (D)
District C: John Nickelson (R)
District D: Grayson Boucher (R)
District E: James Flurry (R)
District F: James Green (D)
District G: Jerry Bowman (D)

External links 
Mayor of Shreveport Page
Shreveport City Council Page

Culture of Shreveport, Louisiana
Politics of Louisiana
Government of Shreveport, Louisiana